Alice Pagani (born 19 February 1998) is an Italian actress, model, and author, best known for playing Ludovica Storti in the Netflix series Baby, and Stella in the Paolo Sorrentino film Loro.

In 2020, she fronted Emporio Armani's Together Stronger campaign with Nicholas Hoult. In 2021, her first novel, the autobiographical coming-of-age story Ophelia, was published by Mondadori Electa.

Personal life

Pagani is from Castel di Lama, in the province of Ascoli Piceno, Marche. Her parents were factory workers, and are divorced. As a child, she was hospitalized for Henoch–Schönlein purpura. She became interested in modeling after her father gave her a camera, to pass the time while recovering. She also has dyslexia.

She was in a relationship with rapper Dylan Thomas Cerulli (Dark Pyrex), a member of Dark Polo Gang. The two own a home in Milan.

In 2021, she appeared on the cover of the Italian edition of Vanity Fair to help express support for the banning of discrimination and hate crimes against women, gay and transgender people.

Filmography

References

External links

1998 births
Living people
Actors with dyslexia
Actresses from Rome
Writers with dyslexia
Italian film actresses
Italian television actresses